Bourré is a former commune in the Loir-et-Cher département in central France. On 1 January 2016, it was merged into the new commune of Montrichard Val de Cher.

Population

See also
Communes of the Loir-et-Cher department

References

Former communes of Loir-et-Cher